Phallon Abaigeal Tullis-Joyce (born October 19, 1996) is an American professional soccer player who plays as a goalkeeper for National Women's Soccer League (NWSL) club OL Reign. She previously played for French Division 1 Féminine club Reims.

Early life and education
Born and raised in Long Island, New York, Tullis-Joyce attended Longwood High School where she was a five year varsity player and most valuable player (MVP). A multiple-award winner, Tullis-Joyce was named all-league, all-conference and all-county her last three seasons and Named League 1 Player of the Year in 2012. She was also named to the state team in 2012-13. 

Tullis-Joyce played club soccer for Match Fit Colchesters and helped lead the team to the US Youth National League Championship in 2013. She previously played for the Farmingdale United  and WPSL FC Westchester Elite. She played for the Eastern New York Olympic Development Program (ODP) as well as the regional ODP team. 

Tullis-Joyce attended the University of Miami where she played collegiate soccer for Miami Hurricanes. As a redshirt freshman, she started in goal nine times, made 24 saves, and conceded 13 goals with one or fewer allowed in five of the matches she played. She ranked ninth in the Atlantic Coast Conference (ACC) in shutouts per game (0.22). During her sophomore season with the team, Tullis-Joyce was the starting goalkeeper and was named to the All-ACC Academic Team. She earned NSCAA College Player of the Week ACC Defensive Player of the Week honors in September 2016.

Club career

Reims, 2019–2021
On January 19, 2019, Tullis-Joyce signed with French club Stade de Reims. She made her debut on April 14, 2019 in a 4–0 league win against Brest. During the 2019-2020 season, she was the starting goalkeeper in 16 matches. Reims finished the regular season in eighth place with a  record. During the 2020-2021 season, she started in all 22 matches. Reims finished the season in sixth place with a  record.

OL Reign, 2021–
On April 8, 2021, Tullis-Joyce signed a 1.5-year contract with American club OL Reign. During the 2021 season, she was a backup goalkeeper for French international Sarah Bouhaddi and made one appearance during the season. The Reign finished in second place during the regular season with a  record. After advancing to the NWSL Playoffs, they were eliminated by eventual champions Washington Spirit.

Tullis-Joyce was the starting goalkeeper during the 2022 NWSL Challenge Cup and 2022 season. As of May 2022, she had earned five Save of the Week honors in eleven matches. In July 2022, she signed a contract extension through the 2024 season with the Reign.

International career
In June 2022, Tullis-Joyce was included in United States national team's 59-player provisional squad for the 2022 CONCACAF W Championship.

Career statistics

Honors
OL Reign
 NWSL Shield: 2022
 The Women's Cup: 2022

Individual
 NWSL Team of the Month: May 2022
 NWSL Challenge Cup All-Tournament Team: 2022
 NWSL Save of the Week: 5x in 2022

Personal life
Tullis-Joyce majored in marine biology and is a certified scientific diver.

References

External links

 
 
 
 Phallon Tullis-Joyce at footofeminin.fr 
 Miami Hurricanes profile

1996 births
Living people
American women's soccer players
Women's association football goalkeepers
Division 1 Féminine players
Miami Hurricanes women's soccer players
Stade de Reims Féminines players
Expatriate women's footballers in France
American expatriate sportspeople in France
OL Reign players
Soccer players from New York (state)
People from Shoreham, New York
Sportspeople from Suffolk County, New York
American expatriate women's soccer players
National Women's Soccer League players